The Balboa is a swing dance that originated in Southern California during the 1920s and enjoyed huge popularity during the 1930s and 1940s.

History
Balboa came from Southern California during the 1920s. Balboa is named after the Balboa Peninsula in Newport Beach, California, where the dance was invented. The Balboa Pavilion, and the Rendezvous Ballroom are credited as the birthplaces of Balboa when dance floors became so crowded that dancers invented a dance to swing music that could be danced in place. Balboa dancing continued in California throughout the twentieth century and spread around the world to the present day.
 In 1978, two long-time Balboa dancers, Hal and Marge Takier, started a twice-a-month Balboa dance at a Bobby McGee's restaurant in Newport Beach. Dancers who danced at the Bobby McGee's Balboa nights and video footage from there became highly influential in informing the Balboa dance as it is done today. Two styles of modern Balboa dance developed, "Pure Bal" is danced in close embrace, and "Bal Swing" is danced in a mix of close embrace and in open position.

Alma Heaton included two pages on Balboa in his 1954 book "Ballroom Dance Rhythms", and a page of instruction in "Techniques of Teaching Ballroom Dance". Heaton described two Bal-Swing figures in 1967.

See also

Collegiate shag

References

External links 
 Balboa & Bal-Swing History - Peter Loggins - Part 1 
 Balboa & Bal-Swing History - Peter Loggins - Part 2
 Balboa & Bal-Swing History - Peter Loggins - Part 3 
 Balboa & Bal-Swing History - Peter Loggins - Part 4 
 Balboa & Bal-Swing History - Peter Loggins - Part 5 
 All Balboa Weekend 
 Balboa Rendezvous Event 
 Eastern Balboa Championships 
 Twin Cities Balboa Festival 
 Incubalboa: Balboa Festival in the Catalan Pyrenees
 Korea Balboa Weekend
 California Balboa Classic

Swing dances